Tim Heinz (born 5 February 1984) is a Luxembourgian footballer who currently plays as a defender for CS Grevenmacher in Luxembourg's domestic National Division.

External links
 

1984 births
Living people
Luxembourgian footballers
Luxembourg international footballers
FC Etzella Ettelbruck players
CS Grevenmacher players
Association football defenders